A.J. Anthony Junior Nelson Manuelle Greaves (born 17 November 2000) is an English professional footballer who plays as a midfielder for York City.

Career
Born in Sheffield, Greaves was captain of the Doncaster Rovers under-18 team before turning professional in 2019. He made his senior debut for Doncaster on 8 October 2019 in the EFL Trophy, having joined Gainsborough Trinity on loan earlier that month.

His contract was extended by Doncaster at the end of 2019–20 season, until 2021.

On 15 October 2021, he was sent out on loan to Southern Football League Premier Division Central side Redditch United on a youth loan.

On 4 February 2022, Greaves joined National League North side York City on loan for the remainder of the 2021–22 season.

Greaves was released by Doncaster at the end of the 2021–22 season. He returned to York City on a permanent contract in July 2022.

References

2000 births
Living people
Footballers from Sheffield
English footballers
Association football midfielders
Doncaster Rovers F.C. players
Gainsborough Trinity F.C. players
Redditch United F.C. players
York City F.C. players
English Football League players
Northern Premier League players